Kavinda is a Sinhalese name that may refer to the following notable people:
Given name
 Kavinda Jayawardena, Sri Lankan politician
 Kavinda de Thissera, Sri Lankan cricketer

Surname
 Ashen Kavinda, Sri Lankan cricketer
 Nuwan Kavinda, Sri Lankan cricketer

Sinhalese masculine given names
Sinhalese surnames